Otonashi (written: 音無 lit. "soundless") is a family name in the Japanese language and may refer to:

People
 Hidetaka Otonashi, Japanese horse race trainer
 Hidetaki Otonashi, Japanese horse race trainer
 Kyosuke Otonashi, Japanese manga artist
 Mikiko Otonashi, Japanese actress
 Ryunosuke Otonashi, a Japanese anime director
 Tamae Otonashi, Japanese film producer

Fictional characters
 Akari Otonashi, one of the supporting characters in the visual novel Kurenai no Tsuki
 Ayana Otonashi, one of the supporting characters in the visual novel Wonderful Everyday
 Fumiko Otonashi, one of the supporting characters in the anime television series Battle Spirits: Shounen Toppa Bashin
 Haruna Otonashi, a character in the video game series Inazuma Eleven
 Io Otonashi, the main character in the manga series Place to Place
 Kaguya Otonashi, one of the main character in the light novel series Magika no Kenshi to Shoukan Maou
 Kaori Otonashi, one of the supporting characters in the Japanese adult video series, portrayed by a former pornographic (AV) actress Ayu Sakurai
 Kazusa Otonashi, one of the supporting characters in the manga series Descendants of Darkness
 Kiruko Otonashi, the main character in the manga series Shinmai Fukei Kiruko-san
 Kotori Otonashi, one of the supporting characters in the video game series The Idolmaster
 Kurumi Otonashi, one of the supporting characters in the Japanese adult video Silent Molestation
 Kyoko Otonashi, the main character in the manga series Maison Ikkoku
 Ikuko Otonashi, one of the supporting characters in the manga series Maison Ikkoku
 Soichiro Otonashi, one of the supporting characters in the manga series Maison Ikkoku
 Kyosuke Otonashi, one of the supporting characters in the video game series Kunio-kun
 Maria "Aya" Otonashi, one of the main character in the light novel series The Empty Box and Zeroth Maria
 Meimi Otonashi, one of the main character in the eroge visual novel series Djibril – The Devil Angel
 Meru Otonashi, one of the supporting characters in the anime series Sayonara, Zetsubou-Sensei
 Miki Otonashi, one of the supporting characters in the original video animation Koutetsu no Majo Annerose
 Miyuki Otonashi, the main character in the Japanese film Godzilla: Final Wars
 Anna Otonashi, one of the supporting characters in the Japanese film Godzilla: Final Wars
 Otonashi, one of the supporting characters in the anime television series Kiteretsu Daihyakka
 Rei Otonashi, one of the supporting characters in the anime television series The World of Narue
 Rinko Otonashi, one of the supporting characters in the manga series Lucky Star
 Ryoko Otonashi, the main character in the light novel Danganronpa/Zero
 San Otonashi, one of the supporting characters in the manga series Rosario + Vampire
 Saya Otonashi, the main character in the anime television series Blood+
 Shizuo Otonashi, one of the supporting characters in the Japanese television drama series Sekai Ichi Muzukashii Koi
 Tsukiko Otonashi, one of the supporting characters in the Japanese television drama series I Love Tokyo Legend – Kawaii Detective
 Yumihiko Otonashi, one of the supporting characters in the anime television series Concrete Revolutio
 Yukari Otonashi, one of the supporting characters in the anime television series The Rolling Girls
 Yura Otonashi, one of the supporting characters in the manga series Gakuen Alice
 Yuzuru Otonashi, the main character in the anime television series Angel Beats!
 Hatsune Otonashi, one of the supporting characters in the anime television series Angel Beats!
 Zakuro Otonashi, one of the supporting characters in the anime television series Qualidea Code

See also
 Kirawa re Kansatsu-kan Otonashi Ichi Roku: Keisatsu Naibu Chōsa no Oni,  Japanese television drama series
 Otonashī Jimi-ko ni Naka-dashi 15 Ayu, a Japanese adult video
 Osorubeshi!!! Otonashi Karen-san  (おそるべしっっ!!!音無可憐さん), a Japanese television drama series
 Otonashi Kawa, a Japanese musical unit consisting of Ryo Shoji (lyrist), Kobayashi (composer) and Takekawa (arranger)
 Otonashi River in Tanabe, Wakayama, Japan
 Otonashi Shinsui Park in Tokyo, Japan
 Sanjūsan go sha otonashi (33号車応答なし), a Japanese film

References

 
Japanese-language surnames